The Abbot of Glendalough was the head of the monastery at Glendalough, founded by Saint Kevin in the early sixth century, which is in modern-day County Wicklow, Ireland. After the death of Saint Kevin, the abbots bore the title "Comarbai Cóemgein" (i.e. "successor of Saint Kevin"). Until the early twelfth century, a number of abbots and others at the monastery of Glendalough had also been consecrated bishops, but this did not necessarily mean they were bishops of Glendalough, since the Diocese of Glendalough was not established until the Synod of Rathbreasail in 1111.

List of abbots
The following is a list of abbots and early monastic bishops. (Those who were consecrated bishops, but did not hold the office of coarb or abbot are indicated in italics and brackets):
Saint Kevin (Cóemgen mac Cóemloga), died 3 June 618 or 622
Colmán Cerbb, also bishop, died 12 December 657/60
Dairchell moccu Rétai, also bishop, died 3 May 678
Do Chumac Conóc, died 687
Dub Gualae, died 712
Énchorach ua Dodáin, died 769
Máel Combair, died 790
Ceithernach, died 799
Mimthenach, died 800
Áed, died 809
Échtbrann, died 809
Guaire, died 810
Eterscél mac Cellaig, also bishop
Suibne mac Ioseph, died 836
Suibne ua Teimnén, died 842
Daniél, also abbot of Tallaight, died 868
Fechtnach, died 875
Dúngal mac Baíthnine, also bishop, died 904
Cormac mac Fidbrain, also bishop, died 927
(Nuada, bishop, but abbot, died 930)
Flann ua hAnaile, died 950
Ferdomnach ua Máenaig, also abbot of Clonmacnoise, died 952
Flann ua hÁeducáin, died 957
Martan, also anchorite and abbot of Tallaight; died 959
Crunnmáel, died 972
Ailill mac Laignig, died 973
Cairpre ua Corra, died 974
Dúnchad ua Mancháin, died 1003
Conn ua Diugraid, died 1014
Flann ua Cellaig, died 1030
Conaing ua Cerbaill, died 1031
Cathassach ua Cathail, deposed 1031, died 1045
Murchad ua Nióc, died 1032
(Máel Brigte ua Máel Finn, bishop, not abbot, died 1041)
Cináed mac Muiredaig, died 1068
In Breithem Ua Mancháin, died 1095
(Cormac Ua Máil, bishop, but not abbot, died 1101)
Tuathal Ua Cathail, died 13 May 1106
Gilla Comgaill Ua Tuathail, was killed by the Forthuatha Laigen in 1127; he was the father of Muirchertach Ua Tuathail, king of the Uí Muiredaig (1141–64), and grandfather of Lorcán Ua Tuathail (St Laurence O'Toole).
Gilla Pátraic mac Tuathail Ua Cathail, was killed by the Uí Muiredaig in 1128; he was the son of Abbot Tuathal Ua Cathail.
Dúnlaing Ua Cathail, died 1153
Lorcán Ua Tuathail (St Laurence O'Toole), became abbot of Glendalough in 1154, and archbishop of Dublin in 1162, died 14 November 1180.

Notes
  It is uncertain whether Áed preceded or succeeded Échtbrann.
  It is uncertain whether Conaing preceded or succeeded Cathassach, who was blinded by Domnall ua Dúnlaing, grandson of Dúnlaing mac Tuathail Uí Muiredaig, king of Leinster (1014).

References

 Glendalough
Glendalough
Religion in County Wicklow